The voiceless or more precisely tenuis dental click is a click consonant found primarily among the languages of southern Africa.

Features
Features of the tenuis dental click:

Occurrence
Tenuis dental clicks are found primarily in the various Khoisan language families of southern Africa and in some neighboring Bantu languages.

References

Click consonants
Oral consonants
Central consonants
Tenuis consonants